The torrent-lark (Grallina bruijnii) is a species of bird in the family Monarchidae found on New Guinea. Its natural habitats are subtropical or tropical moist lowland forests and subtropical or tropical moist montane forest.

References

Grallina
Birds of New Guinea
Birds described in 1875
Taxonomy articles created by Polbot